Multimatic Inc. is a privately held Canadian corporation that supplies components, systems and engineering services to the global automotive industry. Headquartered in Markham, Ontario, Multimatic has manufacturing divisions and engineering facilities in North America, Europe and Asia.

Multimatic was ranked 93 on the Automotive News 2019 Top 100 Global OEM Parts Suppliers list and 56 in their list of the largest suppliers to North America, ranked by sales of original equipment parts in 2018.

Multimatic engineered and constructed the carbon chassis and suspension systems for the RUF CTR3, and Aston Martin One-77, and is Ford's build partner for the 3rd generation Ford GT. Multimatic manufactures the lightweight carbon-fibre Monocoque for the Aston Martin Valkyrie.

The company has also provided engineering input on the Aston Martin V12 Zagato, Aston Martin CC100, and Aston Martin Vulcan models.

References

External links
Official website 

Auto parts suppliers of Canada
Companies based in Markham, Ontario
Manufacturing companies established in 1984
1984 establishments in Ontario
Canadian racecar constructors